The Mangust-class patrol boat, also known as Project 12150, is a Russian Coast Guard vessel. The patrol craft is designed to operate in coastal areas, ports, and other littoral areas, to perform missions like protection of territorial maritime borders, law enforcement, other defense missions, search and rescue, protection of fisheries, and enforcing rules of navigation.

Design
The craft has a modern design with various comforts for the crew like low noise levels, air conditioning and well designed layout for better working and living conditions for the crew. The crafts are armed with a variety of weapons to engage surface, air, and underwater threats. They are also equipped with a small boat to allow the boat to perform missions such as boarding operations.

Operators

Current (2022) 
 Baltic Fleet: 13 boats in operation
 Black Sea Fleet: 26 boats in operation
 Pacific Fleet: 11 boats in operation
 Caspian Flotilla: 11 boats in operation

Former 
2 boats were transferred from the Black Sea Fleet to the Baltic Fleet in 2016. In 2019, one Mangust-class patrol boat,  PSKA-600, was decommissioned and given to a civilian buyer.

See also
 List of ships of Russia by project number

References

Patrol vessels